Epichloë sibirica is a haploid species in the fungal genus Epichloë. 

A systemic and seed-transmissible grass symbiont first described in 2009,  Epichloë sibirica is a sister lineage to Epichloë gansuensis and an early branching clade on the Epichloë tree.

Epichloë sibirica is found in Asia, where it has been identified in the grass species Achnatherum sibiricum.  Epichloë sibirica is not known to be sexual.

References 

sibirica
Fungi described in 2009
Fungi of Asia